Hjula Væverier was a company based in Oslo, Norway. It was one of oldest modern industrial companies in Norway.

It was established as a weaving mill in 1855 by industrialist Halvor Schou (1823-1879) who had previously operated a mill further down the river in the Brenneriveien. The mill utilized water power from the Hjulafossen on the Akerselva  at Sagene. The plant was designed by architect Oluf Nicolai Roll (1818–1906).

In the 1880s it was the largest textile company in Norway, with a total of about 800 employees. It also had production facilities in Lillestrøm and Fredrikstad. The company closed operation in 1957.

In fiction
Novelist and playwright Oskar Braaten (1881-1939) featured working-class life at the mill, most notably in Kring fabrikken (1910).

References

Textile companies of Norway
Manufacturing companies based in Oslo
1855 establishments in Norway
1957 disestablishments in Norway
Companies established in 1855
Defunct companies of Norway
Akerselva